The Masjid al-Nuqtah ( - Mosque of the Drop [of the blood of  Imam Husayn A.S]) is a mosque located on Mount Jawshan in Aleppo, Syria. The main feature of the mosque is a stone believed to be stained with the blood of Husayn ibn ‘Alī by  Muslims.

Also located near this mosque on Mount Jawshan, is a mashad (shrine) known as Mashad al-Siqt ( - Place of miscarriage). As the prisoners of Karbalā were passing through Aleppo, one of wives of Husayn had a miscarriage. The still-born child was named Muhsin, and buried at this place.

Historical accounts

The prisoners of Karbalā were taken through many cities on their way to Damascus on orders from Yazīd. As they were nearing Aleppo, a Christian monk who lived there could see light emanating from the head of Hussain, upwards to the sky. When the caravan stopped for rest, the monk approached them and asked if he could take the head for the night in exchange for 10,000 dirhams that he had with him. When they agreed, the monk took the head and placed it on a stone, whereon blood from the head fell onto it. In the morning he returned the head and professed Islam. This version of events can be found written on a plaque within the mosque itself.

Other versions of the story

 Other Shia narrations relate that when the prisoners of Karbalā were passing through Aleppo, the head of Husayn was placed upon a rock. When blood from the head fell onto the rock, more blood began gushing forth from the rock.

 Sunni sources narrate that a shepherd had a dream wherein he was instructed to build a mosque in honour of Husayn, at the place where one of his goats had its foot sunken into rock. When the shepherd awoke and pulled the goat free from the rock, a river of water began to gush forth.

Artifacts of the mosque

Recent history

The mosque suffered an explosion in 1920 when King Faisal ordered his men to store gunpowder in the mosque. Restorations to the mosque began forty years later, and were completed by the 1970s. The current roof of the mosque was built in 1991.

Hajar-ul-Nuqteh was believed to be at Karachi, Pakistan during 2016-17. It is with a local scholar, Dr Amber Tajwer's residence at Karachi during that time with the written permission from one of Administrative of Al-Nuqteh Mosque. It was placed for security reasons and was on display for limited gathering.

See also
 Holiest sites in Islam (Shia)
 ‘Āshūrā'
 Battle of Karbalā
 Husayn ibn ‘Alī
 ‘Alī Zaynul ‘Ābidīn
 Zaynab
 Umm Kulthūm
 ‘Abbās
 ‘Alī al-Akbar
 ‘Alī al-Asghar
 Qāsim
 Sukayna

References

Architecture in Syria
Shia mosques in Syria
Islamic shrines
Mosques in Aleppo